Jakob Blåbjerg Mathiasen (born 11 January 1995) is a Danish former professional footballer who played as a defender.

Youth career
Blåbjerg joined AaB as a U14 player from Vejgaard BK.

Club career

AaB
In September 2012, Blåbjerg signed his first full-time contract and was to be promoted to the first team squad from the summer 2013. He got his Superliga debut for AaB in February 2013 against Silkeborg IF alongside Kasper Pedersen, as the four regular options for the centre-back position were all out with either injuries or bans. Blåbjerg was promoted to the first team squad in the summer 2013 at the age of 18, but did not play any games the whole season while AaB won the league and the Danish Cup.

In the following season Blåbjerg played 7 league matches in the first half year and 11 matches in the second half of the season. His performances were rewarded with a contract extension in the summer, which would keep him in the club until 2018. He was mostly used as a fullback.

In the 2015–16 season played 26 league matches. In the 2016–17 season he made 22 league appearances.

Loan to Vendsyssel
On 2 September 2019, Blåbjerg was loaned out to Vendsyssel FF for the 2019–20 season.

On 25 July 2020, 25-year old Blåbjerg confirmed, that he would retire with immediate effect. Blåbjerg told media that he planned to travel around Europe and afterwards continue studying.

Personal life
Blåbjerg studied energy on bachelor's degree at Aalborg University and studied to become an engineer. Aalborg University had a collaboration with AaB, so when Blåbjerg was in Dubai with the Danish U21 national team, he took an exam through his computer.

Honours

Club
AaB
Danish Superliga: 2013–14
Danish Cup: 2013–14

References

External links
 
 Profile at DBU

Living people
1995 births
Sportspeople from Aalborg
Association football defenders
Danish men's footballers
AaB Fodbold players
Vendsyssel FF players
Danish Superliga players
Denmark under-21 international footballers
Footballers at the 2016 Summer Olympics
Olympic footballers of Denmark